Mangajin was a monthly English-language magazine for students of Japanese language and culture by Mangajin, Inc. It was distinct from many other magazines of its type in that it unabashedly embraced Japanese popular culture as a learning tool and a route towards rapid acclimation into Japanese society. Each issue featured selections from various popular manga translated into English with detailed cultural and linguistic commentary.

It was a unique language learning tool in that the manga that it excerpted showed the use of the language in various types of informal conversations. It would feature a few pages of manga with explanations of the grammar used and when that grammar/vocabulary combination might be appropriate. By contrast, most Japanese language textbooks for early students focus on formal versions of the language appropriate for business discussions.

The magazine ceased publication in December 1997 (issue 70) due to financial hardship. With increased worldwide interest in Japanese pop culture, the original manga publishers expected higher payments for their content, possibly beyond what was practical in this type of educational publication. Various books that collect many of the magazine's best features (as well as back issues of the magazine itself) are still highly prized by both self-taught and professionally tutored students of Japanese. An  e-zine also continued the tradition of the publication.

Thus, it is "a manga magazine for outsiders".

History
Mangajin began shaping in 1988 when businessman and translator Vaughan P. Simmons began making prototypes of a magazine that could combine Japanese popular culture, entertainment, and language learning into one. Simmons worked with clients from American and European companies and saw how successful they could be with the Japanese and learned the culture, which boosted up the motivation for Mangajin. When developing the concept, manga became an ideal solution with the medium being so large and attracting some of the best artists and writers. Manga also gives a big perspective on real Japanese society and how the language is spoken. Simmons started creating a "four-line-format" which shows the actual text as found in a Japanese manga, a romanization for pronunciation, a literal translation showing the structure of the expression, and an idiomatic English equivalent.

Beginning with issue #49, the magazines include companion audio tapes for the corresponding issues until the end of the print edition at issue #70. Each tape contains audio reenactments of all of the Japanese manga material in that issue. Side A contains the stories acted by native Japanese-speaking voice actors. Side B contains stories read without pause, first in Japanese, then in English. For some of the longer/wordier issues, part of the line-by-line recording from Side A runs over onto Side B.

North American versions were distributed by Weatherhill, Inc. Following the end of print magazine publication, Wasabi Brothers Trading Company and Rolomail Trading became publishers for Mangajin materials. Following the purchases of Weatherhill, Inc. by Shambhala Publications, Mangajin materials were published by Shambhala Publications.

Japanese versions were distributed by Sekai Shuppan, inc.

Features

Manga series (bilingual English-Japanese)

Publications

Mangajin magazines
Mangajin's Basic Japanese Through Comics: A compilation of issues 1-24 of Mangajin magazines categorized in lessons format. Each lesson consists of 6 pages of illustrations from the comics sections of the source magazines.
Weatherhill version: /
Mangajin's Basic Japanese Through Comics (Part 2): Same as the previous release, but different lessons from issues 25-48 of Mangajin.
Weatherhill version: /
Mangajin CD-ROM: Contains selected manga from the first 10 issues of Mangajin magazine, with trademark translations, language and cultural notes, and digitalized native Japanese voice recording. Tony Gonzalez was the author of the CD-ROM.
Mangajin's Japanese Grammar Through Comics
Weatherhill version: /

Other Mangajin, Inc. books
Bringing Home the Sushi: An Inside Look at Japanese Business through Japanese Comics: A collection of business manga, in English, with introductory essays by Japan specialists
Weatherhill version: 
The Essence of Modern Haiku: 300 haiku poems by Seishi Yamaguchi: An English translation of Seishi Yamaguchi's haiku collection.
Weatherhill version: / (paperback), / (hardcover)
Senryū: Haiku Reflections of the Times: A compilation of 100 senryu that have appeared over an eight year period in Japan's most popular newspaper, the Yomiuri.
Unlocking the Japanese Business Mind: An in-depth analysis of the complex cultural dynamics Japanese and Americans must confront when they come together to do business.
DIANE Publishing Company version: /
Weatherhill version: /

Rolomail Trading Company Products
Joyo Kanji Wall Chart Set: Contains 3 wall charts with the entire 1,945 General Use Chinese Characters.
The Kanji Way to Japanese Language Power
2nd edition: /
A Guide to Remembering Japanese Characters: Includes etymology of 1,945 General Use Chinese Characters.
2nd edition: /
Salaryman Kintaro: The Complete Series: Contains all 10 Volumes of the series.

Sekai Shuppan, inc. products
Master English the Mangajin Way/ 漫画人英語上達革命 マンガで英語をものにするトレーニング・ブック: Includes print and cassette tape editions.

Stone Bridge Press products
Japanese the Manga Way: An Illustrated Guide to Grammar and Structure: Includes translated comic book panels from the Mangajin magazines.
Stone Bridge Press version: /

See also 

 List of manga magazines published outside of Japan

References

External links
 (Wasabi Brothers Trading Company)
Weatherhill, Inc. page: Mangajin
Sekai Shuppan, inc. page: 漫画人 Mangajin
Archive of all 70 issues: Mangajin

1988 establishments in Japan
1997 disestablishments in Japan
Defunct magazines published in Japan
English-language magazines
Manga magazines published in Japan
Monthly magazines published in Japan
Magazines established in 1988
Magazines disestablished in 1997
Japanese language learning resources
Japanese language